The Unafraid is a 1915 American drama film directed by Cecil B. DeMille. Extant at George Eastman House. Rita Jolivet completed this film just before boarding the Lusitania on its final voyage. The film survives and is preserved in the film archive at George Eastman House.

Cast
 Rita Jolivet as Delight Warren
 House Peters as Stefan Balsic
 Page Peters as Michael Balsic
 William Elmer as Jack McCarty
 Lawrence Peyton as Danilo Lesendra
 Theodore Roberts as Dual Empire Secret Agent
 Al Ernest Garcia as Joseph
 Marjorie Daw as Irenya
 Raymond Hatton as Russian Valet
 Gertrude Kellar as Countess Novna

References

External links

1915 films
1915 drama films
Silent American drama films
Films directed by Cecil B. DeMille
American silent feature films
American black-and-white films
1910s American films